Exora is a genus of leaf beetles in the family Chrysomelidae.

Species
 Exora callanga Bechyné, 1956
 Exora cingulata Bechyné, 1956
 Exora costaricensis Bechyné, 1958
 Exora diversemaculata Bechyné, 1956
 Exora encaustica (Germar, 1823)
 Exora obsoleta (Fabricius, 1801)
 Exora olivacea (Fabricius, 1801)
 Exora paraensis Bechyné, 1958
 Exora rosenbergi (Bowditch, 1925)
 Exora rufa (Weise, 1921)
 Exora signifera (Bechyné, 1956)
 Exora tippmanni (Bechyné, 1956)
 Exora wittmeri (Bechyné, 1956)

References

Galerucinae
Chrysomelidae genera
Taxa named by Louis Alexandre Auguste Chevrolat